Amayenge is a popular Zambian music group.  Started by Chris Chali in 1978 in Choma, the band was originally called Crossbones, one of many Zambian acts that had sprung up to do gigs based on rock. Later the band became known as the New Crossbones, after a change in direction, sponsorship and management.  The musical style of the group is called kalindula, a distinctive Zambian popular style with traditional African roots.  Chali died 30 May 2003, but the band has continued with Fraser Chilembo as their leader.  Amayenge has received worldwide attention from WOMAD in London to Asia and the Americas.  In the words of one author:

The band has continued to perform in Zambia and other southern African countries. This team made Zambia to be known in Southern Africa in terms of Music. The team also inspired a lot of young people in Zambia, Tanzania, Malawi, Zimbabwe and Congo DR. Their membership has changed somewhat in recent years but news reports from the Times of Zambia, Zambian Post and Zambia Daily Mail routinely report their activities.  A recent report is typical of news accounts of the band:

Kalindula is a Zambian musical style that was originally played on "banjos" (pronounced 'bahn-jos'), a 4-stringed bass (called 'mbabadoni' or 'kalindula'), [ngoma] drums, chisekele shakers and metal bells. Western guitars and percussion have replaced the homemade banjos and drum sets used previously

Current Band Members:  Alice Chali (Dancer/Vocalist, Obert Chali (Vocalist/Dancer), Emmanuel Kayeji (Dancer/Vocalist), Bester Mudenda (Dancer/Vocalist), Jonathan Nthanga (Lead Guitar), Mathews Mulenga (Rhythm Guitar), Joseph Mwamba (Drums), Davy Muthali (Percussionist), Chabala Chitambo (Percussionist), Donald Njovu (Percussionist), Eddy Moto (Sound Engineer), Sam Chiluba (Bass), Fraser Chilembo - Band Manager

US Tour 
In 1996, Amayenge traveled to Whidbey Island, WA, where they met up with Moye Kashimbi, who had left Zambia to marry US citizen, Vernon Huffman, who became Tour Director for Amayenge. The band was enthusiastically received by audiences across the Pacific Northwest.

Discography 
 1979.  Ukuilondola.  (meaning to introduce oneself). First single
 1989.  Amayenge.   Amayenge.  Brentford, Middlesex, England: Mondeca Records.  LP recording  
 1991.  Phone.  Amayenge (Musical group).  Amayenge.  Ndola, Zambia: Teal Records.  1 sound cassette : analog. 
 .  Ichupo Ne n'ganda (marriage and a home).  
 2001.  Amayenge, Part 1.  Amayenge (Musical group).  Lusaka, Zambia: Mondo Music Corp.  Compact disc.
 2004.  Dailesit. - the last album recorded by Kris Chali before his death.
 2005.  Mangona Kulila ('The drums play')
 .  Chipolopolo
 .  Bangwele
 .  Matenda

The band is also included on the following recordings:
 1983, 2004.  Zambush, Vol. 1 - Zambian hits from the '80s.  Utrecht, the Netherlands: SWP Records.  Compact disc.
 1989.  Zambiance.  Compact disc.
 2002.  Sounds of Zambia, Volume 3.  Lusaka, Zambia: Mondo Music Corp.  Compact disc.

Awards 
2007 - Brath Awards, Best Kalindula Band 
2005 - Ngoma Awards Festival, Best Band award (6th time to receive this award) 
1993 - Best Band of the year at the Zambia International Trade Fair Show

Newspaper articles 
Zambia Times: 
 June 29, 2001 - August 17, 2001 
 August 25, 2001 - November 23, 2001 - "Ngoma awards: Who grabs what?" 
 May 17, 2003 - December 19, 2003 
 August 20, 2004 - September 18, 2004 
 January 14, 2006 - February 17, 2006 
Zambia Daily Mail 
Zambian Post: Thursday December 21, 2006 
"Artistes converge at Mumana for Valentines" By Augustine Mukoka, Joseph Mwenda and Pictures Thomas Nsama 
Thursday February 22, 2007

See also 
 List of African musicians

External links
Amayenge: Download Amayenge Music
Amayenge: National Geographic World Music

Zambian musical groups
1978 establishments in Zambia